Zula Hula is a 1937 Fleischer Studios animated short film starring Betty Boop, and featuring Grampy.

Due to the use of negative racial stereotypes, this short is seldom screened today.

Synopsis
Betty and Grampy are on an around-the-world flight when they are forced to crash-land on an apparently deserted island. Betty is upset with their situation, but Grampy quickly invents a number of gadgets that allow them all the comforts of home. Things again take a turn for the worse when a group of cannibals show up. Quick thinking Grampy charms the savages by creating a calliope out of the crashed plane's parts. While the natives are distracted by the music, Grampy and Betty repair their plane and make a hasty escape.

Reception
Motion Picture Herald said on January 15, 1938, "The whole of the business is detailed in an amusing and rapidly drawn vein of clever cartooning. Similarly, on January 29, Boxoffice described the short as "another one of those sheer wacky cartoons that gather a fair share of laughs."

References

External links
 Zula Hula on Youtube
 
 Zula Hula at IMDb.

1937 animated films
Betty Boop cartoons
1930s American animated films
American black-and-white films
1937 films
Paramount Pictures short films
Fleischer Studios short films
Short films directed by Dave Fleischer
Films about cannibalism
Films about race and ethnicity
Films set on islands
Film controversies
Race-related controversies in animation
Race-related controversies in film